John Thomas Carr (7 October 1878 – 17 March 1948) was an English professional footballer with Newcastle United between 1899 and 1912, playing at full back, he made 279 appearances, scoring 5 goals.

Career
Carr won three League Championships and the FA Cup with Newcastle in this successful period of the club's history.

He made two appearances for England, both against Ireland, in a 1–1 draw on 25 February 1905 and in a 1–0 victory on 16 February 1907.

In 1912, he became a trainer at Newcastle United and would fill this position for the next 10 years. He eventually left the club when Blackburn Rovers made him their manager in 1922. Carr was the coach of the Danish national side at the 1920 Summer Olympics football competition in Antwerp.

Personal life 
Carr served as a corporal in the Army Service Corps during the First World War.

Honours

Newcastle United
First Division champions: 1904–05, 1906–07, 1908–09
FA Charity Shield winner: 1909
FA Cup winner: 1910

References

Bibliography

External links

1878 births
1948 deaths
English footballers
Newcastle United F.C. players
England international footballers
English football managers
Blackburn Rovers F.C. managers
Denmark national football team managers
Expatriate football managers in Denmark
English Football League players
English Football League representative players
English Football League managers
English cricketers
Northumberland cricketers
Association football wing halves
Association football fullbacks
British Army personnel of World War I
Royal Army Service Corps soldiers
FA Cup Final players